The  Philadelphia Soul season was the twelfth season for the franchise in the Arena Football League. The Soul played at the Wells Fargo Center. The Soul won their second ArenaBowl the previous season beating the Arizona Rattlers. The Soul lost once in the regular season and repeated as ArenaBowl Champions in the playoffs after defeating the Tampa Bay Storm 44–40 in ArenaBowl XXX.

Staff

Roster

Schedule

Regular season
The 2017 regular season schedule was released on January 5, 2017.

Playoffs

Standings

References

Philadelphia Soul
Philadelphia Soul seasons
Philadelphia Soul
ArenaBowl champion seasons